75 mm field gun can refer to:
 French Canon de 75 modèle 1897
 British 75_mm_Gun_M1917
 Polish